1914 in the Philippines details events of note that happened in the Philippines in the year 1914.

Events

July
 July 23 – The province of Moro is dissolved.
 July 27 – Iglesia ni Cristo is registered to the government by Felix Manalo.

September
 September 1:
The province of Cotabato is founded.
The province of Davao is founded.

Holidays

As per Act No. 345 issued on February 1, 1902, any legal holiday of fixed date falls on Sunday, the next succeeding day shall be observed as legal holiday. Sundays are also considered legal religious holidays.

 January 1 – New Year's Day
 February 22 – Legal Holiday
 April 9 – Maundy Thursday
 April 10 – Good Friday
 July 4 – Legal Holiday
 August 13  – Legal Holiday
 November 26 – Thanksgiving Day
 December 25 – Christmas Day
 December 30 – Rizal Day

Births
March 3 - Teofilo Camomot, Roman Catholic bishop, servant of God (d. 1988)
June 27 - Helena Benitez, former Senator, Chairman  and founder of Philippine Women's University (d. 2016)

References